Mary Elizabeth (née Chamberlain) Bassett (1855 or 1858–December 1892), commonly known as Elizabeth and Eliza Bassett, was a Wild West pioneer, cattle rancher, and cattle rustler. Born in Arkansas, and raised by her grandfather in Virginia, Bassett headed west with her husband Herbert Bassett. Unusual for the time, the Bassetts lived and worked according to their specific talents and interests, rather than traditional gender roles. Bassett ran the cattle and sheep ranch and raised thoroughbred horses. Her husband managed the agricultural operations and taught their children. When large cattle companies began to push out small cattle ranchers and homesteaders, Bassett organized other locals to fight back. Her daughters Ann and Josie Bassett became notable in their own right. Butch Cassidy and the Sundance Kid were close family friends of the Bassetts and often stayed and worked at the ranch to "cool down" following their illegal escapades.

Early life
Mary Elizabeth Chamberlain, born around 1858, was the daughter of Hannah Emerson Miller (1840-1861) and Ewell Chamberlain (1825-1864), a Confederate Sergeant during the Civil War who was wounded on May 6, 1864 and died on June 16, 1864, in Lynchburg, Virginia of his wounds, following amputation of his leg. Her grandfather was Judge Crawford Miller. Having lost her parents during the Civil War, Mary Elizabeth lived with her Grandfather Miller on his plantation.

Her daughter Ann said of her:

Marriage
In 1868, Mary Elizabeth Chamberlain married Herbert Bassett, becoming Mary Elizabeth Bassett. Herbert served the Union Army during the Civil War. After the war, he worked for the Internal Revenue Service as a collector in Norfolk, Virginia. After their marriage, the couple moved to Little Rock, Arkansas. They headed west in 1871, having traveled by train to Rock Springs, Wyoming, and then south along the Green River, where they visited Herbert's brother Samuel Clark Bassett, who was a United States government scout along the Overland Trail. In 1877, the Bassett family, which now included daughter Josie and son Sam, moved to the rugged frontier area of Browns Park, known for "cattle rustling and outlaw sheltering". Their daughter Ann was born in 1878. She was the first white child born in Browns Park.  Herbert was out of place in an area that required hard labor. He was an intellectual and a musician. Bassett realized that she needed to provide a living for the family and became a cattle rancher and rustler. She relied on Isam Dart, who was a ranch hand who also cooked meals, washed laundry, cut wood, and performed other household duties for the family. Josie and Ann attended Miss Porter's select Finishing School for Girls in Boston for a proper education, and they were also proficient horseback riders and ropers. Elizabeth advocated for women's right to vote, was interested in feminism, and believed in one's roles should be based upon talent and interest, rather than gender. Herbert schooled the children and she ran the ranch.

Ranch and farm

The Bassetts were among the first homesteaders at Browns Park, located within a valley that is five miles wide and thirty miles long. The area was good for cattle ranching, where the surrounding mountains protected the valley against the cold winter weather. In addition, there was an abundance of sweet grass and fresh water. In 1878, the Bassetts built a log house, with a well-stocked library, for their cattle ranch. It was located near the entrance to Lodore Canyon and alongside a clear mountain spring. The house with furnished from her grandfather's Virginia plantation and furniture hand-made locally of wood, leather, and buckskin. 

The initial years were hard. Bassett hunted wild game. The Native Americans taught them how to fish, what plants to harvest, and how to make jerky. The Bassetts grew grain and hay and raised horses, cattle, and sheep. They welcomed day and overnight visitors and they participated in and hosted dances. Bassett was kind to her family, neighbors, and ranch hands. Members of the Wild Bunch, including Butch Cassidy and the Sundance Kid, often stayed at the ranch to "cool off". They worked as ranch hands and were close friends of the Bassett family. Butch Cassidy hid at the ranch after he robbed the Telluride Bank in 1889.

Following the Meeker Massacre (1879), Herbert took the children to Rock Springs in Wyoming to avoid hostilities between the Ute People and the United States government. Bassett wanted to stay behind to oversee the ranch, but Herbert was adamant that she leave with the rest of the family. One year later, they returned to their ranch to find it had not been burned down as fearede. She focused much of her attention on breeding thoroughbred horses, which was her passion. Herbert planted an orchard and grew plants in the family's garden.

As investors and cattle monopolies sought to move Native Americans to reservations, relinquishing more prime land, they began to buy large tracts of land and began to push out homesteaders and small ranches. The large concerns, backed by the influential Wyoming Stock Growers Association, sought to create a poor opinion of the smaller ranches in the press by claiming that they were cattle rustlers. A former practice of a community-based roundup of cattle and grouping them by brand ended when the large cattle ranchers rounded up large numbers of cattle, without sorting out the cattle by brand.

Bassett Gang
Bassett decided to band together with other small ranches and homesteaders to prevent cattle from large ranches from grazing on their land. Some also rustled cattle to make up for their cattle that had been rounded up by the large ranches.

Bassett became the leader of what was called the Bassett Gang, which included Isam Dart, Matt Rash, Jim McKnight, and Angus McDougal. She was a charming woman, skilled in riding horses, shooting rifles, and executing her plans. Bassett honored treaties made with Native Americans.

According to John Rolfe Burroughs, author of Where the Old West Stayed Young, "Technically, rustling cattle was a felony offense. It is not an exaggeration to say, however, that with very few exceptions, everybody. . .in Brown's Park engaged in it."

Death
Bassett died of an internal injury—such as a burst appendix or complication of pregnancy—in December 1892.

References

1855 births
1892 deaths
People from Arkansas
Outlaws of the American Old West
American cattlemen
People from Routt County, Colorado